Rescue Mission is a Philippine television comedy show and broadcast on TV5, which has run from November 27, 2008 to February 5, 2009. The show was presented by TJ Trinidad.

See also
List of programs aired by The 5 Network

References

2008 Philippine television series debuts
2009 Philippine television series endings
TV5 (Philippine TV network) original programming
Philippine comedy television series
Filipino-language television shows